Kerstin Cook (born 15 April 1989) is a Swiss-British model and beauty pageant titleholder who won Miss Switzerland 2010 and then represented her country in the 2011 Miss Universe pageant.

Early life
She is born to English parents, Karen and Derek and she has two older brothers Richard (born 1985) and James (born 1987). Cook has been working as a model since age 14. She has a degree in environmental science and works for the Swiss animal help organization STS. She is also an avid sportswoman, participating in athletics and inline skating.

Miss Switzerland 2010

Prior to finals night, Cook discovered her grandmother in Cambridge had a  cancer recurrence, and would have to undergo chemotherapy. Unable to travel to England, Cook dedicated her participation in Miss Switzerland to her.

References

External links
Official Miss Switzerland website
Kerstin Cook's Official Website

Living people
Miss Switzerland winners
Miss Universe 2011 contestants
1989 births
People from Lucerne
Swiss people of English descent